

The Mercury Control Center (also known as Building 1385 or simply MCC) provided control and coordination of all activities associated with the NASA's Project Mercury flight operation as well as the first three Project Gemini flights (the first two had no crew). It was located on the Cape Canaveral Space Force Station, east of Samuel C. Phillips Parkway.

The facility was expanded in 1963 to support Project Gemini by contractor Pan American World Airways to provide more meeting space along with space for data analysis, and a large space for a new Gemini spacecraft trainer.

The more complex requirements of later Gemini and Apollo flights forced control operations to move to a larger facility located in Houston, Texas, but the MCC continued to be used for training and meeting space. On June 1, 1967, the Center became a historic stop for public tours, and continued this function through the mid-1990s.

Configuration

The MCC was organized into three rows and was smaller and simpler than subsequent control centers. It needed only to support a mission of no more than 36 hours with a spacecraft less complex than those used on future missions. Positions included those for monitoring the spacecraft and astronauts during flight as well as positions for supporting the launch and recovery of the capsule.

The MCC also featured a large backlit status map for display of the capsule position. Unlike later mission control centers which featured computer generated graphics, this Mercury-era display operated with a physical two-dimensional representation of the capsule suspended and lit in front of the map.

More modern mission control centers were split between launch control, which is located at the launch site such as Cape Canaveral, and mission control which is located at the Lyndon B. Johnson Space Center for the Apollo and Space Shuttle programs or at the Jet Propulsion Laboratory for unmanned missions.

Tracking and ground facilities
Though the MCC provided command and control, it was not the only facility involved in supporting Mercury or Gemini flights. The Computing and Communications Center was located at the Goddard Space Flight Center in Greenbelt, Maryland and provided computing power for missions.

To minimize the time that the spacecraft was out of communications range with the ground, additional ground stations were established at US military facilities, tracking ships, and in cooperation with the governments of Spain, United Kingdom, Nigeria and Australia:

 Cape Canaveral (CNV-MCC)
 Grand Bahama Island (GBI)
 Grand Turk Island (GTI)
 Bermuda (BDA)
 Atlantic Ship (ATS)
 Maspalomas Station, Grand Canary Island (CYI)
 Kano, Nigeria (KNO)
 Zanzibar (ZZB)
 Indian Ocean Ship (IOS)
 Muchea, Australia (MUC)
 Woomera, Australia (WOM)
 Canton island, Kiribati (CTN)
 Kauai, Hawaii (HAW)
 Point Arguello, California (CAL)
 Guaymas, Mexico (GYM)
 White Sands, New Mexico (WHS)
 Corpus Christi, Texas (TEX)
 Eglin Air Force Base (EGL)

Location
The building was erected between 1956 and 1958 and was used throughout Project Mercury (1961–1963) and for Project Gemini through Gemini 3 (1964–1965). 

Though the building was listed on the National Register of Historic Places on April 16, 1984, as a contributing property to Cape Canaveral Air Force Station, asbestos removal, other repairs and restoring the center to its original state would have cost $6 million. The decision was made to preserve the consoles and other equipment and destroy the building.

In 1999, consoles, displays and other equipment were moved to the Kennedy Space Center Visitor Complex to a recreation of the MCC inside the Kurt Debus Center. Consoles and displays were reassembled and many are powered on.

References

 :File:Cape Canaveral Air Force Station Mission Control Center - HAER FL-8-AV.pdf  Extensive report on MCC

External links
 NASA KSC documentary videos on the Mercury Mission Control Center
 Photos of original building and recreation of the flight control area
 MCC Gallery
 Documentary of MCC

Cape Canaveral Space Force Station
Project Mercury
NASA
National Historic Landmarks in Florida
Buildings and structures in Merritt Island, Florida
National Register of Historic Places in Brevard County, Florida
Buildings and structures demolished in 2010
Demolished buildings and structures in Florida